Husbands and Lovers is a 1924 American silent comedy film directed by John M. Stahl and starring Florence Vidor and Lewis Stone. It was produced by Louis B. Mayer and released by First National Pictures.

Plot
As described in a review in a film magazine, James Livingstone (Stone), reaching the stage where he regards his wife Grace (Vidor) as a valet as she “lays out” her husband’s clothes, is rudely awakened when she takes his advice and "dolls up.” Rex Phillips (Cody), debonair friend of James, also takes notice of the change with some flattery. As a result, the two become infatuated. James abruptly learns of the secret friendship when his circumstances cause him to substitute for Phillips in a tryst with Grace. He consents to her obtaining a divorce. James comes to realize he is still in love and to appreciates his former wife’s yearning for verbal flattery. She is about to marry Rex when James, like a regular caveman, carries Grace away in her bridal array to his car and elopes to the minister’s to be wedded a second time.

Cast

Preservation
A complete print of Husbands and Lovers is preserved by MGM and also at Filmmuseum EYE Institut, Netherlands.

References

External links

Smith, Imogen Sara (2019), "Husbands and Lovers", essay for the San Francisco Silent Film Festival

1924 films
American silent feature films
Films directed by John M. Stahl
First National Pictures films
American black-and-white films
1920s American films